KMFC (92.1 FM) is a radio station broadcasting a Contemporary Christian format. It is licensed to Centralia, Missouri, United States, and serves the Columbia, Missouri area. The station is owned by the Educational Media Foundation.

The station extends coverage to Columbia through translator K295CI (106.5 FM).

History

Before being K-Love, KMFC was locally-owned by the Clair Group, and featured a mix of contemporary Christian music, Christian talk, and paid religious programming.  KMFC's original studios were located at 1249 E. Highway 22 in Centralia.

External links

Centralia, Missouri
MFC
Radio stations established in 1987
K-Love radio stations
1987 establishments in Missouri
Educational Media Foundation radio stations
MFC